Henry Pelham-Clinton may refer to:
Henry Pelham-Clinton, 2nd Duke of Newcastle-under-Lyne (1720–1794)
Henry Pelham-Clinton, 4th Duke of Newcastle-under-Lyne (1785–1851)
Henry Pelham-Clinton, 5th Duke of Newcastle-under-Lyne (1811–1864)
Henry Pelham-Clinton, 6th Duke of Newcastle-under-Lyne (1834–1879)
Henry Pelham-Clinton, 7th Duke of Newcastle-under-Lyne (1864–1928)

See also
Henry Pelham (disambiguation)
Henry Clinton (disambiguation)